"Broken" is the first episode of the second season of the American ABC fantasy/drama television series Once Upon a Time, and the show's 23rd episode overall. It premiered September 30, 2012.

In this episode, Mr. Gold decides to get revenge on Regina; and later in the Enchanted Forest, Phillip, Aurora, and Mulan face a wraith.

It was co-written by Edward Kitsis and Adam Horowitz, while being directed by Ralph Hemecker.

Plot

Opening Sequence
A wraith is shown hovering in the forest.

Outside Storybrooke
The first scene of the episode takes place in New York City, where a dove lands on the windowsill of an apartment owned by an unidentified man (Michael Raymond-James). Stuck to its foot is a postcard from Storybrooke, with the word "Broken" written on it.

In Storybrooke
In Storybrooke, Emma Swan (Jennifer Morrison) prevents a mob of townspeople, led by Dr. Whale (David Anders), from attacking Regina Mills (Lana Parrilla), who is still powerless despite the fact that magic is now present in Storybrooke, and instead takes her to jail. There, Mr. Gold (Robert Carlyle) uses the wraith's talisman to mark her. He then uses the talisman and his dagger to summon the wraith. Gold had promised Belle (Emilie de Ravin) that he would not kill Regina, which technically he has not since a wraith consumes souls, and she walked out on him after learning what he had done. Emma had also promised Henry (Jared S. Gilmore) that she would prevent Regina from being killed, so she, Mary Margaret (Ginnifer Goodwin), and David (Josh Dallas) join forces with Regina and use Jefferson's hat to banish the wraith to the fairytale world. Regina informs the others that the fairytale world was destroyed by the curse, so this will have the effect of banishing the wraith to "an oblivion." They succeed, but the wraith pulls Emma into the portal as well and Mary Margaret follows, unwilling to abandon her child again. David takes charge of Henry, who tells Regina that he will never speak to her again if she does not bring Mary Margaret and Emma back to Storybrooke. Belle returns to Gold who tries to send her away and explains that he is still a monster, but she responds that she must stay with him for that very reason.

In the Enchanted Forest
In the Enchanted Forest, Prince Phillip (Julian Morris) awakens Princess Aurora (Sarah Bolger) from a magical, year-long sleep with true love's kiss. But they and Phillip's traveling companion, the female warrior Mulan (Jamie Chung), are soon attacked by a wraith, a soul-sucking monster. Unbeknownst to the women, Phillip is "marked" by the wraith's talisman as they drive it off, so the wraith will now follow him relentlessly. After they make camp, Phillip leaves the two women so they will not be harmed when he is attacked. When Aurora notices his absence, Mulan realizes what has happened and goes to pursue him while Aurora insists on following. Aurora then accuses Mulan of being in love with Phillip, but Mulan denies this. They find Phillip and Mulan offers to take on the mark so that Phillip and Aurora can be together, but Phillip refuses. Phillip succumbs to the wraith's attack; his last words are "I love you," and it is left unclear to whom he was speaking. Aurora and Mulan lay Phillip in the palace where Aurora was sleeping.

The final scene of the episode reveals a twist: the storyline of Aurora, Phillip, and Mulan is not a flashback, but rather takes place in a part of the fairytale world whose inhabitants were—for an unknown reason—not removed by the Evil Queen's curse, and is contemporaneous with the Storybrooke plotline.  Mulan explains to Aurora that they were frozen in time for 28 years until time resumed, allowing Phillip and Mulan to complete their quest. But the land has been ravaged by the effects of the curse and the survivors had gathered in a safe haven. Before Mulan and Aurora can begin to travel there, they discover Mary Margaret and Emma, unconscious under some debris, and Mulan blames them for the wraith's arrival.

Production

"Broken" was co-written by co-creators Edward Kitsis and Adam Horowitz, while being directed by V veteran Ralph Hemecker. With the curse broken in the first season finale, the writers felt that they could now go farther with each of the characters. In an attempt to instill a "whole different vibe" into the series, they envisioned a larger ambition than the previous season. Horowitz explained, "We have been allowed to do more at the start of the [season]. Without addressing the budget, everybody at the studio is on board with this as a big-canvas show… A lot of it actually is the learning-curve aspect of season 1, where we figured out what we can do and how to do it well. We learned how to maximize our bang for our buck. The biggest key is time. If we can figure out our stories far enough in advance, the more time our effects team and department heads will have."

First season recurring actresses Emilie de Ravin (Belle) and Meghan Ory (Red Riding Hood/Ruby) became members of this season's main cast. Two additional actresses who joined the recurring cast were Sarah Bolger as Aurora and Jamie Chung as Mulan, who both made their debuts during this episode.

Reception

Ratings
On its first broadcast, "Broken" was watched by an estimated 11.36 million viewers, placing second in its timeslot behind NBC's Football Night in America. The episode earned a ratings share of 3.9/10, meaning that it was seen by 3.9 percent of all 18- to 49-year-olds, and 10 percent of all 18- to 49-year-olds watching television at the time of broadcast. The ratings it garnered were considered to be a success for the series, as it was down only five percent from the previous season premiere.

Reviews
The premiere of season two, "Broken" was received generally positive reviews.

IGN's Amy Ratcliffe graded "Broken" with 8.5 out of 10, an indication of a "great" episode. She found Snow and Emma's descent into the hat to be a "surprising turn of events and a fun way to force them together and make them work out their new mother/daughter roles." Ratcliffe also enjoyed the pairing for Mulan and Aurora, but criticized the wraith for its similarities to the Dementors from Harry Potter. She concluded, "I was worried about the direction of the show once magic was back on the table in such a direct way, but the writers have set the stage for plenty of solid character development. The various relationships and their sorted issues – including Mr. Gold & Belle and Snow & Emma (who is none too pleased with being left without parents for 28 years) -- have such potential. I'm looking forward to seeing what happens next."

Oliver Sava from The A.V. Club gave a B+ rate to the episode saying "Mr. Gold bringing magic back to Storybrooke in a wave of fuchsia fog, and this season 2 opener confirms that this show is going to be a completely different beast going forward."

Laura Prudom from Huffpost TV stated that the writers of the show have pointed the show in a compelling direction with plenty of new mysteries to unravel. "Overall, "Broken" was a gripping and competently plotted hour -- none of the scenes felt extraneous and although there was undoubtedly a lot of plot and set-up to get through in 42 minutes, the narrative certainly felt more liberated without the curse hanging over everyone's heads. I think Horowitz and Kitsis have pointed the show in a compelling direction with plenty of new mysteries to unravel, and I'm eager to see how magic affects our world."

References

External links
 

2012 American television episodes
Once Upon a Time (season 2) episodes